Paliano is a town and comune in the province of Frosinone, in the Lazio region of central Italy.

History 

Paliano was the seat of a branch of the powerful Colonna family whose head was Lord, then Duke, then Prince of Paliano. Their fortress dominates the town. In 1556 papal forces captured the town, which was governed for a few years by Giovanni Carafa, nephew of Pope Paul IV, as Duke. His wife, was the Duchess of Paliano celebrated in Stendhal's novella of the same name.

Upon the death of Paul IV in 1559, Marcantonio Colonna regained the town. His participation in the naval battle of Lepanto in 1571 is commemorated by the Via Lepanto leading to the family palazzo. The 17th century church of Sant’ Andrea contains the tombs of the Colonna, including a magnificent tomb for Prince Filippo II Colonna by Bernardino Ludovisi, completed in 1745. In the 19th century the Colonna fortress was sold to the Papal States, which used it as a prison.

References

 Robert Enggass, “Ludovisi’s Tomb for a Colonna Prince.” The Burlington Magazine. CXXXV (1993): 822–824.

External links
 Abridged History of Rome: Paliano
 lazio.indettaglio.it on Paliano
 Storia di Paliano

Cities and towns in Lazio